Urho Pellervo Peltonen (15 January 1893 – 7 January 1951) was a Finnish athlete who competed mainly in the javelin throw.

He competed for Finland in the 1912 Summer Olympics held in Stockholm, Sweden, in both the regular and two-handed javelin throw, a one-time Olympic event in which the total was counted as a sum of best throws with the right hand and with the left hand. Peltonen won a bronze medal in the latter event behind fellow Finns Julius Saaristo and Väinö Siikaniemi and one place ahead of Swede Eric Lemming, who had won the one hand competition. Eight years later after World War I he again competed for Finland in the 1920 Summer Olympics held in Antwerp, Belgium, where he won the silver medal in the regular javelin as Finland swept the first four places with Jonni Myyrä winning, Paavo Johansson in third and Saaristo in fourth.

His personal best, set in Helsinki in 1916, was 64.35 m. This was superior to Lemming's official world record at the time of 62.32 m, but was never ratified by IAAF as a new world record. However, it was ratified as a Finnish record.

After retiring from competitions Peltonen became an official with the International Association of Athletics Federations.

References

1893 births
1951 deaths
People from Nurmes
Finnish male javelin throwers
Olympic silver medalists for Finland
Olympic bronze medalists for Finland
Athletes (track and field) at the 1912 Summer Olympics
Athletes (track and field) at the 1920 Summer Olympics
Athletes (track and field) at the 1924 Summer Olympics
Olympic athletes of Finland
Medalists at the 1920 Summer Olympics
Medalists at the 1912 Summer Olympics
Olympic silver medalists in athletics (track and field)
Olympic bronze medalists in athletics (track and field)
Sportspeople from North Karelia
19th-century Finnish people
20th-century Finnish people